This is a list of films which ranked number one at the weekend box office for the year 2021.

Number-one films

Highest-grossing films

Calendar gross
Highest-grossing films of 2021 by Calendar Gross

In-year release

See also
 Lists of American films — American films by year
 Lists of box office number-one films

Additional notes

References

Chronology

2021
2021 in American cinema
United States